The Group III tournament was held July 23–27, in Kuala Lumpur, Malaysia, on outdoor hard courts.

Format
The eight teams were split into two groups and played in a round-robin format. The top two teams of each group advanced to the promotion pool, from which the two top teams were promoted to the Asia/Oceania Zone Group II in 2004. The bottom two teams of each group were placed in the relegation pool, from which the two bottom teams were demoted to the Asia/Oceania Zone Group IV in 2004.

Pool A

Results of Individual Ties

Pool B

Results of Individual Ties

Promotion pool
The top two teams from each of Pools A and B advanced to the Promotion pool. Results and points from games against the opponent from the preliminary round were carried forward.

Results of Individual Ties

Kuwait and Malaysia promoted to Group II for 2004.

Relegation pool
The bottom two teams from Pools A and B were placed in the relegation group.  Results and points from games against the opponent from the preliminary round were carried forward.

Results of Individual Ties

United Arab Emirates and Kyrgyzstan demoted to Group IV for 2004.

References

2003 Davis Cup Asia/Oceania Zone
Davis Cup Asia/Oceania Zone